The European Spine Journal is a peer-reviewed medical journal dedicated to orthopedics as it relates to all aspects of the human spine. It was established in 1992 and is published eight times per year by Springer Science+Business Media. It is the official journal of EuroSpine, the Spine Society of Europe. The editor-in-chief is Robert Gunzburg, a spinal surgeon in private practice in Antwerp, Belgium. According to the Journal Citation Reports, the journal has a 2017 impact factor of 2.634.

References

External links

Springer Science+Business Media academic journals
Publications established in 1992
Orthopedics journals
English-language journals
Monthly journals